Ləj (also, Lazh and Lyazh) is a village and municipality in the Lankaran Rayon of Azerbaijan.  It has a population of 1,596.

Notable natives 

 Asker Aliev— National Hero of Azerbaijan.

References 

Populated places in Lankaran District